Kable may refer to:

Glenn Kable (born 1963), a Fijian sport shooter who specializes in the trap
Henry Kable (1763–1846), an Englishman convicted of burglary and sent to the penal colony of Australia
Kable House, a building that housed the Staunton Military Academy from 1873 to 1976, in Staunton, Virginia
Kabletown, an unincorporated community in Jefferson County, West Virginia, United States
Mike Kable Young Gun Award, an Australian award for the best rookie V8 supercar driver
Kable v Director of Public Prosecutions (NSW), an important Australian legal case about imprisonment for public protection
Gamer (film), a 2009 American science fiction, action, thriller film, the main character is named, Kable

See also
Cable (disambiguation)
Cabel (disambiguation)
Kabel (disambiguation)